International Gay Rugby (IGR), formerly known as the International Gay Rugby Association and Board (IGRAB), is the umbrella organisation for the world's gay and inclusive rugby clubs. Based in London, UK, IGR is recognised by World Rugby as the representative organisation of the LGBT and inclusive rugby community, up to the point they both have signed a Memorandum of Understanding outlining a commitment between the two organisations to work together to educate and eliminate homophobia in rugby.

Also, IGR provides its member clubs with development support and resources in the areas of club organisation, recruitment, retention, fundraising, event management, and  regional and national union relations. IGR ensures the regular celebration of the Bingham Cup, the biennial world championships of gay and inclusive rugby, as well as the Union Cup, the European tournament.

Member Clubs
 IGR lists 94 gay and inclusive rugby clubs as members.

Africa

South Africa
 Jozi Cats, Johannesburg

Asia

Israel
 Tel Aviv Leviathans RFC, Tel Aviv

Japan
 Osaka Rugby, Osaka
 Tokyo Tyrants Rugby Club, Tokyo

Europe

Belgium
 Brussels Straffe Ketten, Brussels

Denmark
 Copenhagen Wolves RFC, Copenhagen

England
 Berkshire Unicorn, Maidenhead, Berkshire
 Birmingham Bulls, Birmingham, West Midlands
 Brighton & Hove Sea Serpents, Brighton & Hove, Sussex
 Bristol Bisons, Bristol
 Chester Centurions, Chester, Cheshire
 Coventry Corsairs, Coventry, West Midlands
 Derby Raiders, Derby, Derbyshire
 Hull Roundheads, Hull, Yorkshire
 Kings Cross Steelers, London
 Leeds Hunters, Leeds, Yorkshire
 Liverpool Tritons, Liverpool, Merseyside
 The London Stags, London
 Manchester Village Spartans, Manchester
 Newcastle Ravens, Newcastle upon Tyne, Tyne & Wear
 Northampton Outlaws, Northampton, Northamptonshire
 Reading Renegades, Reading, Berkshire
 Sheffield Vulcans, Sheffield, Yorkshire
 Typhoons RUFC, Preston, Lancashire
 Westcountry Wasps RFC, Teignmouth, Devon. (Devon’s first LGBTQ+ Inclusive rugby club).
 Wessex Wyverns, Southampton, Hampshire
 The Worcester Saxons RFC, Worcestershire
 York R I Templars, York, Yorkshire

France
 Les Coqs Festifs, Paris
 Les Gaillards, Paris
 Los Valents de Montpellier, Montpellier
 Rebelyons, Lyon
 Tou'Win, Toulouse

Greece
 Athenian Centaurs RFC, Athens

Ireland
 Belfast Azlans, Belfast, Northern Ireland
 Cork Hellhounds, Cork, Ireland
 Emerald Warriors, Dublin, Ireland

Italy
 Libera Rugby, Rome

Germany
 Berlin Bruisers, Berlin
 Cologne Crushers, Cologne, North Rhine-Westphalia
 Munich Monks, Munich, Bavaria

Netherlands
 ARC Lowlanders, Amsterdam

Norway
 Oslo Raballders RUFC, Oslo

Portugal
 Lisbon Dark Horses, Lisbon

Scotland
 Caledonian Thebans, Edinburgh
 Glasgow Raptors, Glasgow
 Dunfermline Knights, Dunfermline 
 Aberdeen Taexali, Aberdeen

Spain
 Madrid Titanes, Madrid

Sweden
 Stockholm Berserkers, Stockholm

Wales
 Cardiff Lions, Cardiff
 Swansea Vikings, Swansea

North America

Canada
 Armada Montréal, Montreal, Quebec
 Ottawa Wolves, Ottawa, Ontario
 Toronto Muddy York, Toronto, Ontario
 Vancouver Rogues RFC, Vancouver, British Columbia

Mexico
 Mexico City Spicy Barbarians, Mexico City

United States
 Atlanta Bucks, Atlanta, Georgia
 Baltimore Flamingos, Baltimore, Maryland
 Boston Ironsides, Boston, Massachusetts
 Charleston Blockade, Charleston, South Carolina
 Charlotte Royals, Charlotte, North Carolina
 Charm City Knights, Baltimore, Maryland
 Chicago Dragons, Chicago, Illinois
 Colorado Rush, Denver, Colorado
 Columbus Coyotes, Columbus, Ohio
 Columbus Kodiaks, Columbus, Ohio
 Crescent City Rougaroux, New Orleans, Louisiana
 Dallas Diablos, Dallas, Texas
 Dallas Lost Souls, Dallas, Texas
 Gotham Knights, New York City, New York
 Los Angeles Rebellion, Los Angeles, California
 Madison Minotaurs, Madison, Wisconsin
 Milwaukee Beer Barons, Milwaukee, Wisconsin
 Minneapolis Mayhem, Minneapolis, Minnesota
 Nashville Grizzlies, Nashville, Tennessee
 Philadelphia Gryphons, Philadelphia, Pennsylvania
 Phoenix Storm, Phoenix, Arizona
 Portland Lumberjacks, Portland, Oregon
 San Diego Armada, San Diego, California
 San Francisco Fog, San Francisco, California
 Seattle Quake, Seattle, Washington
 Space City Rugby, Houston, Texas
 St. Louis Crusaders, St. Louis, Missouri
 Washington Renegades, Washington, DC
 Washington Scandals, Washington, DC

South America

Argentina
 Ciervos Pampas Rugby Club, Buenos Aires
 Huarpes Rugby Club, Mendoza
 Ruda Macho Rugby, Buenos Aires

Chile
 Titanes Rugby Club, Santiago

Oceania

Australia
 Adelaide University Sharks, Adelaide, South Australia
 Brisbane Hustlers, Brisbane, Queensland
 Melbourne Chargers, Melbourne, Victoria
 Perth Rams, Perth, Western Australia
 Sydney Convicts, Sydney, New South Wales

New Zealand
 New Zealand Falcons, Auckland

International
 International Society of Inclusive Rugby Referees
 IGR World Barbarians

See also

Mark Kendall Bingham Memorial Tournament
Bingham Cup
Union Cup
LGBT community

References

External links

Rugby union governing bodies
Rugby league governing bodies
International LGBT sports organizations

Sports organizations established in 2002